KWPU (90.5 FM) is a non-commercial radio station that serves the William Penn University campus and the Oskaloosa, Iowa area. The station broadcasts a variety format. KWPU is owned by William Penn University.

The station told the FCC in a notification of suspension of operations that it went silent on March 5, 2018, when its tower was blown over in a wind storm.

The transmitter and broadcast antenna are located on the campus of William Penn College.

Previous logo

References

External links

William Penn University
WPU
Radio stations established in 1976
IGC
1976 establishments in Iowa